Rubropsichia is a genus of moths belonging to the family Tortricidae.

Species
Rubropsichia brasiliana Razowski, 2009
Rubropsichia fuesliniana (Stoll, in Cramer, 1781)
Rubropsichia kartaboana Razowski, 2011
Rubropsichia santaremana Razowski, 2009

Etymology
The name refers to the second part of the name Mictopsichia, and the main colour of the moth. It is derived from Latin ruber (meaning red).

See also
List of Tortricidae genera

References

  2009: Revision of Mictopsichia Hübner with descriptions of new species and two new genera (Lepidoptera: Tortricidae). Polish Journal of Entomology 78 (3): 223–252. Full article: 
  2011: Descriptions of five new species of the Neotropical Mictopsichia group of genera (Lepidoptera: Tortricidae). Zootaxa, 3058: 63–68. Preview

External links
Tortricid.net

 
Archipini